The 2015–16 Gimnàstic de Tarragona's season was the 129th season in the club's existence and the first in Segunda División since being promoted from the third level of the Spanish football after defeating SD Huesca in the play-offs. Nàstic returned to the second tier after a three-year absence.

Players

Squad

Technical staff

Transfers

In

Total spending:  €70,000

Out

Total gaining:  €0

Balance
Total:  €70,000

Contracts

Player statistics

Squad Stats 

 

|-
|colspan="12"|Players on loan to other clubs:

|-
|colspan="12"|Players who have left the club after the start of the season:

|}

Top scorers

Disciplinary record

Competitions

Pre-season/Friendlies

Copa Catalunya

Segunda División

Results summary

Results by round

Matches

Copa del Rey

Play-offs

Semifinals

References

External links
Official website 
Match highlights 
Club news in Diari de Tarragona 

 

2015–16 in Catalan football
Spanish football clubs 2015–16 season
Gimnàstic de Tarragona seasons